The 2016–17 Davidson Wildcats women's basketball team represented Davidson College during the 2016–17 NCAA Division I women's basketball season. The Wildcats, led by seventh year head coach Michele Savage, played their home games at the John M. Belk Arena as members of the Atlantic 10 Conference. They finished the season 6–23, 4–12 in A-10 play to finish in a tie for eleventh place. They lost in the first round of the A-10 women's tournament to Fordham.

On March 8, Michele Savage was fired. She finished at Davidson with a 7-year record of 96–123.

2016–17 media

Davidson Wildcats Sports Network
Select Wildcats games will be broadcast on Teamline with Derek Smith and Leslie Urban providing the call. Most home games will also be featured on the A-10 Digital Network. Select games will be televised.

Roster

Schedule

|-
!colspan=9 style=| Non-conference regular season

|-
!colspan=9 style=| Atlantic 10 regular season

|-
!colspan=9 style=| Atlantic 10 Women's Tournament

Rankings

See also
 2016–17 Davidson Wildcats men's basketball team

References

Davidson Wildcats women's basketball seasons
Davidson
2016 in sports in North Carolina
2017 in sports in North Carolina